Chaparral Ice  is an ice skating facility located in Austin, Texas and Cedar Park, Texas. It is the home ice facility for the American Collegiate Hockey Association's Texas Longhorns ice hockey team, and the Youth Hockey Foundation of Austin. It was also the home facility of the Austin Ice Bats from 2006 to 2008.

References

External links
Chaparral Ice website

Indoor arenas in Texas
Indoor ice hockey venues in the United States
Sports venues in Austin, Texas